Scutella is an extinct genus of sand dollars (flat sea urchins) in the family Scutellidae.

These slow-moving semi-infaunal detritivores lived from the Oligocene to the Quaternary epoch (48.6 to 0.012 Ma.).

Species 
 Scutella gabbi Raimond 1863
 Scutella paulensis Agassiz 1841

References 

Miocene animals
Clypeasteroida
Pliocene animals
Pleistocene animals
Extant Oligocene first appearances
Cenozoic animals of South America
Fossil taxa described in 1816
Prehistoric echinoderms of Africa